Tony Graham is a retired professional soccer forward who spent one season in the North American Soccer League, one in the American Soccer League and three in the Major Indoor Soccer League.

Graham attended the University of San Francisco where he was a member of the men's soccer team.  In 1978, Graham signed with the Oakland Stompers of the North American Soccer League.  In the fall of 1978, he joined the Cincinnati Kids of the newly established Major Indoor Soccer League.  In 1980, he played for the Columbus Magic of the American Soccer League.  He played for two MISL teams during the 1980-1981 season, the Denver Avalanche and the Cleveland Force.

References

External links
 NASL/MISL stats

American soccer players
American Soccer League (1933–1983) players
Cincinnati Kids players
Cleveland Force (original MISL) players
Columbus Magic players
Denver Avalanche players
Major Indoor Soccer League (1978–1992) players
North American Soccer League (1968–1984) players
Oakland Stompers players
San Francisco Dons men's soccer players
St. Louis Steamers (original MISL) players
Living people
1956 births
Soccer players from San Francisco
Association football forwards